Wang Fu Court is a Home Ownership Scheme court developed by the Hong Kong Housing Authority in Yuen Long, New Territories, Hong Kong next to Yuen Long Nullah. It comprises a single residential block in the Tung Tau Industrial Area completed in 2017.

Houses

Politics
Wang Fu Court is located in Yuen Long Tung Tau constituency of the Yuen Long District Council. It was formerly represented by Lam Ting-wai, who was elected in the 2019 elections until July 2021.

See also

Public housing estates in Yuen Long

References

Yuen Long Town
Home Ownership Scheme
Residential buildings completed in 2017